Alec Fraser was an actor.

Alec Fraser may also refer to:

Alec Fraser (footballer), Scottish footballer
Alec Garden Fraser, educator

See also
Alec Fraser-Brunner, British ichthyologist
Fraser (surname)
Alex Fraser (disambiguation)
Alexander Fraser (disambiguation)
Fraser (disambiguation)